Neuregulin 1, or NRG1, is a gene of the epidermal growth factor family that in humans is encoded by the NRG1 gene. NRG1 is one of four proteins in the neuregulin family that act on the EGFR family of receptors. Neuregulin 1 is produced in numerous isoforms by alternative splicing, which allows it to perform a wide variety of functions. It is essential for the normal development of the nervous system and the heart.

Structure 

Neuregulin 1 (NRG1) was originally identified as a 44-kD glycoprotein that interacts with the NEU/ERBB2 receptor tyrosine kinase to increase its phosphorylation on tyrosine residues. It is known that an extraordinary variety of different isoforms are produced from the NRG1 gene by alternative splicing. These isoforms include heregulins (HRGs), glial growth factors (GGFs) and sensory and motor neuron-derived factor (SMDF). They are tissue-specific and differ significantly in their structure. The HRG isoforms all contain immunoglobulin (Ig) and epidermal growth factor-like (EGF-like) domains. GGF and GGF2 isoforms contain a kringle-like sequence plus Ig and EGF-like domains; and the SMDF isoform shares only the EGF-like domain with other isoforms. The receptors for all NRG1 isoforms are the ERBB family of tyrosine kinase transmembrane receptors. Through their displayed interaction with ERBB receptors, NRG1 isoforms induce the growth and differentiation of epithelial, neuronal, glial, and other types of cells.

Function

Synaptic plasticity 

Neuregulin 1 is thought to play a role in synaptic plasticity. It has been shown that a loss of Neuregulin 1 within cortical projection neurons results in increased inhibitory connections and reduced synaptic plasticity.  Similarly, overexpression of Neuregulin 1 results in disrupted excitatory-inhibitory connections, reduced synaptic plasticity, and abnormal dendritic spine growth. Mutations in human L1 cell adhesion molecules are reported to cause a number of neuronal disorders. In addition, recent research in Drosophila model has also shown Nrg's involvement in regulating dendritic pruning in ddaC neurons in a Rab5/ESCRT-mediated endocytic pathway. Thus, careful regulation of the amount of Neuregulin 1 must be maintained in order to preserve an intricate balance between excitatory and inhibitory connections within the central nervous system (CNS). Any disruption in this inhibitory system may contribute to impaired synaptic plasticity, a symptom endemic in schizophrenic patients.

Isoforms 

At least six major types (different N termini) of neuregulin 1 are known. Six types exist in humans and rodents (type I, II and III NRG1 are expressed in excitatory and inhibitory neurons, as well as astrocytes), and some types (I and IV) can be regulated by neuronal activity.

Clinical significance 

Neuregulin 1-ErbB4 interactions are thought to play a role in the pathological mechanism of schizophrenia. A high-risk deCODE (Icelandic) haplotype was discovered in 2002 on the 5'-end of the gene. The SNP8NRG243177 allele from this haplotype was associated in 2006 with a heightened expression of the Type IV NRG1 in the brains of people suffering from schizophrenia. Further, the NRG1-ErbB4 signalling complex has been highlighted as a potential target for new antipsychotic treatment.

Additionally, Neuregulin 1 has been shown to modulate anxiety-like behaviors.  Endogenous Neuregulin 1 may bind to its receptor, ErbB4, expressed on GABAergic neurons within the basolateral amygdala.  Administration of exogenous Neuregulin 1 to the basolateral amygdala of anxious mice produced an anxiolytic effect, which has been attributed to the enhancement of GABAergic neurotransmission.  Thus, treatments aimed at reducing anxiety, which may contribute to emotional instability in many schizophrenic patients, by targeting the effects of mutations in NRG1 and ERBB4, may yield positive results for those afflicted by both anxiety disorders as well as schizophrenia.

Neuregulin has been shown to be involved in the myelination of central nervous system (CNS) axons.  There exist at least two modes of myelination within the CNS—one that is independent of neuronal activity and another that is promoted by the activation of NMDA receptors by glutamate on oligodendrocytes.  Neuregulin is involved in the "switching" of oligodendrocytes from the mode of myelination that is independent of neuronal activity to the mode that is dependent upon glutamate binding to NMDA receptors.  It is thought that Neuregulin 1 found on axons of CNS neurons interacts with its receptor, ErbB4, to promote the myelination of that axon, and any disruption in this signaling contributes to decreased myelination.  Since Neuregulin 1 promotes myelination and is decreased in schizophrenic patients, along with the finding that schizophrenic patients experience white matter deficits, mutations within Neuregulin 1 may underlie cognitive deficits associated with lower white matter integrity, especially within frontotemporal connections.

The protein also has the putative ability to protect the brain from damage induced by stroke. Those with a genetic variant of neuregulin 1 tended to be more creative.

There is evidence that NRG1 is a tumor suppressor gene.

There is also strong evidence that NRG1 plays a critical role in Schwann cell maturation, survival, and motility, important in research related to neurofibromatosis type two (NF2).

Heart 

Neuregulin-1 (NRG-1), a cardioactive growth factor released from endothelial cells, is necessary for cardiac development, structural maintenance, and functional integrity of the heart. NRG-1 and its receptor family ErbB can play a beneficial role in the treatment of chronic heart failure (CHF) by promoting survival of cardiac myocytes, improving sarcomeric structure, balancing Ca2+ homeostasis, and enhancing pumping function. Downstream effectors of NRG-1/ErbB, include cardiac-specific myosin light chain kinase (cMLCK), Protein Phosphatase type 1 (PP1), sarcoplasmic reticulum Ca2+-ATPase 2 (SERCA2), and focal adhesion kinase (FAK). The beneficial effects of neuregulin-1 make recombinant human neuregulin-1 (rhNRG-1) a potential drug for treatment of CHF.

Maintenance of heart structure 

NRG-1 treatment of adult rat ventricular myocytes stimulate the formation of a multiprotein complex between ErbB2, FAK, and p130(CAS), which modulates the restoration of cell–cell contacts between isolated myocytes, allowing for synchronous beating.  Furthermore, FAK is also involved in the maintenance of sarcomeric organization, cell survival, and myocyte–myocyte interactions.  The sarcomeric effects of NRG-1 protects myocytes against structural disarray induced by stressors, including cytotoxic agents.

Cardiomyocyte survival under stress 

Under conditions of stress, including viral infection, cytotoxic agents, and oxidative stress, activation of NRG-1/ErbB signaling can protect myocardial cells against apoptosis. In contrast to embryonic and neonatal cardiomyocytes, adult myocardial cells are terminally differentiated and have lost the ability to proliferate. Therefore, growth of adult cardiac cells is commonly characterized by hypertrophy and an increased content of contractile proteins. However, studies have shown NRG-1 promotes myocardial regeneration through hyperplasia, and prevents hypertrophy surrounding infarcted areas.

Restoration of cardiomyocytes 

The cMLCK protein is an important regulator of sarcomere assembly through activation of the myosin regulatory light chain, as well as playing a role in heart contractility.  In contrast to smooth and skeletal muscle MLCKs, cMLCK expression is restricted to cardiac myocytes. Overexpression of cMLCK increases cell contractility. Treatment of cardiac myocytes with rhNRG-1 significantly upregulated cMLCK expression or activity??? in CHF rat models, together with an improvement in both cardiomyocyte structure and pumping function. Therefore, cMLCK is a downstream protein regulated by NRG-1/ErbB signaling and plays a role in rhNRG-1-mediated improvements in CHF.

Improvements in cardiac efficiency 

Altered calcium homeostasis has been suggested to play a role in the development of heart failure. Modulated by phospholamban (PLB), SERCA2 regulates uptake of Ca2+ into the sarcoplasmic reticulum (SR) from the cytoplasm and contributes to the relaxation of cardiomyocytes. This process is also important for determining the SR Ca2+ load after relaxation and, thus, impacts on contractility.
PP1 dephosphorylates PLB,  inhibiting SERCA2 activity.  In the failing heart, PP1 expression is upregulated, resulting in increased PLB dephosphorylation and decreased SERCA2 activity. Preliminary studies have revealed that rhNRG-normalizes SERCA function and enhances myocardial contractility through the inhibition of increasedPP1 expression, which leads to increased PLB phosphorylation and activation of SERCA2.

Interactions 

Neuregulin 1 has been shown to interact with ERBB3 and LIMK1.
A schizophrenia associated- missense mutation in Neuregulin 1 has been shown to be associated with changes in cytokine expression using lymphoblastoid cells of heterozygous carriers vs homozygous wild type individuals 

Specifically, the missense mutation involves a single nucleotide change of a valine to a leucine within the transmembrane domain of Type 3 Neuregulin 1.  It is thought that this single nucleotide change affects the ability of γ-secretase to cleave the intracellular domain (ICD) of the Type 3 isoform of Neureglin 1.  That is, the valine to leucine mutation within the transmembrane domain of Type 3 Neuregulin 1 decreases the amount of ICD that γ-secretase is able to cleave. The ICD of Type 3 Neuregulin 1 has been shown to suppress transcription of inflammatory cytokines, including IL-1β, IL-6, IL-10, IL-8, IL12-p70, and TNF-α.  Using recombinant ErbB4 to stimulate the cleavage of the intracellular domain of Type 3 Neuregulin 1, a receptor for Type 3 Neuregulin 1, Marballi et al. showed that increased levels of the ICD lead to a decrease in IL-6 levels.  Given the involvement of Neuregulin 1 in schizophrenia and the finding that the valine to leucine missense mutation in mice produces working memory deficits, NRG1 seems a likely genetic candidate that confers susceptibility to the development of schizophrenia.

References

Further reading

External links 
 
'New way' to repair heart damage
 NRG1 rs3924999, hypothetical major gene locus of general intelligence
 Links from Schizophrenia Research Forum:
Neuregulin, ErbB4—Levels Normal but Signaling Strengthened in Schizophrenia - 18 June 2006.
Neuregulin and ErbB4 Mutant Mice Reveal Myelin and Synaptic Deficits - 2 May 2007.
Functional Neuregulin Variant Linked to Psychosis, Abnormal Brain Activation and IQ - 30 October 2006.
Neuregulin, ErbB4 Drive Developmental Cell Fates
Neuregulin Partner ErbB4 Spices Up Genetic Associations - 17 February 2005
Polymorphisms and Schizophrenia—The Ups and Downs of Neuregulin Expression - 21 April 2006.
Neuregulin Studies Suggest Synaptic Deficits in Schizophrenia - 4 June 2007

Proteins
Neurotrophic factors